Mix (stylized as MIX) is a Japanese baseball-themed manga series written and illustrated by Mitsuru Adachi. It is a sequel to Touch. It has been serialized in Shogakukan's shōnen manga magazine Monthly Shōnen Sunday since May 2012. As of February 2023, the chapters have been compiled into twenty tankōbon volumes. A 24-episode anime television series adaptation by OLM was broadcast from April to September 2019. A second season is set to premiere in April 2023.

Plot
Thirty years after Tatsuya and Kazuya Uesugi brought Meisei High School to their only appearance and championship at the National High School Baseball Championship, a pair of highly talented stepbrothers, Touma and Souichirou Tachibana, bring the possibility of a return to the Kōshien, as they learn of the Meisei High sports heritage of their fathers.

Characters

Main characters

When Touma was six years old, his widowed father, Eisuke Tachibana, married the widow Mayumi Sawai, who also brought her two children, Souichirou and Otomi, into the family. Touma has a wry sense of humor but is friendly and has an outgoing personality that naturally draws people in. Coincidentally, Touma and Souichirou share the same birthday, Touma only being born ten minutes later than his step-brother. Throughout childhood Touma competed with his new brother to see who would be the destined pitcher of the pair and who would relent and be the catcher for the other. Due to his phenomenal pitching speed and maybe because of a successful round of rock-paper-scissors, Touma became the pitcher. In middle school he was held back from being the ace pitcher while the coach gave preferential treatment to a less talented pitcher. Once that situation was resolved, he became the ace in his final year of middle school and later named ace in his first year of High School. Touma and Otomi are bonded in a 'special' way and Otomi is Touma's first fan. Touma is able to do his best when there's Otomi, even if he hates it when she calls him "Tou-chan".

Touma's older brother. He is an athletic and intelligent boy, especially gifted with strategic thinking, perfect for his position as catcher on the baseball team. Whenever Souichirou, an overly protective big brother, realizes that their little sister Otomi may be alone at home or otherwise, he will insist that Touma drop whatever task is at hand in order to accompany Otomi instead . He is seemingly competitive with Touma but it is possible that he intentionally forfeited the position of pitcher to Touma when they wagered the position in a game of rock-paper-scissors. Both his stepfather, Eisuke, and his coach, Gorou, (both of whom knew that Souichirou’s biological father was an outstanding pitcher himself) express their confusion, on separate occasions, over why he gave up pitching. To his coach he gave a partial response while speaking in third person, "Touma has Souichirou Tachibana when he pitches but he [Souichirou] isn't there when I throw." He also appears to be a ladies’-man, dating many different girls throughout middle school and the early part of high school. After falling in love with Haruka at first sight, he stops dating so many girls but she doesn't seem inclined to return his affection. He regularly visits the ramen restaurant where she worked part-time just to spend time with her.

A pretty and popular girl who is a talented flutist in the school's brass band. She is only a year younger than her brother and step-brother. She grew up shy, reserved, and especially frightened of strangers after her father died but Touma's companionship and outgoing, confident personality helped her overcome that weakness. She now seems to rely on Touma as much, if not more, than her blood-related brother and will pay extra attention to him, such as making him "special" versions of food. Otomi is Touma's first fan and thinks that Touma shines, when he throws. Touma and Otomi have a 'special' bond and even Souichirou has taken notice of this. When she first met Haruka, Otomi asked her which of her brothers is her type, but is rendered speechless when Haruka responds "Hmmm, are you worried?".

Tachibana family

Touma's father, his marriage to Mayumi is his second. His first wife died when Touma was only three years old. He is rough looking, a bit of a goofball and a complainer, but he is also a hard worker (except when skipping work to go to his sons' baseball games), cheerful, and loyal to friends and family. He was a secondary pitcher at Meisei at the same time as Oyama and Sawai, never able to wear the ace number as a player. Although Sawai did gift him his jersey after he was injured.

The mother of Souichirou and Otomi, her marriage to Eisuke is her second. She was originally married to Keiichi Sawai and never knew of his connection to Eisuke until the second marriage began. She is a beautiful and charming woman but can get upset when her husband and Gorou drink in the middle of the day and disrupt the family's dinner. She has a habit of telling everyone she meets about her family's unique make-up.

An energetic but fat Samoyed, as in Touch and H2. Katsu also had a family dog named Punch but it was, appropriately, a Boxer.

Souichirou and Otomi's deceased father. In his first year of High School at Meisei he was chosen as the team's ace pitcher over Eisuke in his third year. During the final game of the year his hand was permanently damaged and he never pitched again. Although he couldn't play, he cheerfully stayed with the team for the next two years as a manager. When he married Mayumi he never told her about his playing days. He died late enough that Souichirou has some memory of him smiling when he gave him a baseball glove, but Otomi says she doesn't really remember him at all.

Touma's mother, she died when Touma was three years old. According to Eisuke, she was the ace pitcher of her softball team, and a national tournament runner-up.

Meisei students and staff

Gorou's pretty daughter. Upon entering Meisei she joined and quickly became a star of the rhythmic gymnastics team but because of a broken arm in her first year and the club being disbanded in her second year she has also been able to be the baseball team's manager. She is a talented scout and may even have a better mind for the game than her father. When Haruka and Touma were both three and Touma's mother died, they met at the funeral and spent the day together, at one point she punched him for being hyper and disrespectful and made him cry. During a break in the baseball schedule she took Touma on a day trip to the spot where they met in hopes that he would remember their time together. He has no memory of it but she fondly remembers their short time spent together and has always wondered how he turned out.

The new coach of the Meisei High School baseball team. He says he turned down other jobs to take the Meisei position but this may have been a bluff to make him look better. He is generally seen as a lazy guy and not all that responsible, but he has a good mind for baseball. He is separated from his wife, an upcoming author, but not divorced. His daughter moved with him when he started his new job. He was the captain of the Meisei team when he was younger and is still close friends with Eisuke, his former teammate.

A quiet but hulking power hitter and third baseman who moved to Tokyo and entered Meisei presumably to continue playing for Gorou, turning down invitations from more prestigious baseball schools to do so, but it is more likely he did it in order to stay close to Haruka. She just considers him a childhood friend though. He looks intimidating but is easily frightened by insects. Although competing with Souichirou for Haruka's affection, he will quietly tag along with him if they meet and can't see Haruka.

A good student and former star soccer player. Arisa Mita likes him but he starts to have feelings for Otomi while they were both Jr. High Class Representatives. His older brother is the star slugger at Kenjou High but he says the two of them don't get along very well. When he gets to High School he quits soccer and joins the baseball team. He is speedy, a good hitter and can play center field. His brother acknowledges his skill.

She considers Otomi her rival in beauty and popularity and is jealous of her good relationship with her crush, Ryou Akai. She tries to outdo her whenever she can. She eventually secretly befriends Tomohito Akai but insists there's no romantic attraction. She became the manager of the soccer team in middle school, presumably to be close to Ryou, but continues the position in high school despite his departure.

A boastful classmate of Otomi and a talented pitcher himself. He believes he is destined to be the baseball team's ace pitcher because his name means "Summer's Number One," and indeed he was the Middle School's ace once Touma leaves for High School. He is one of many boys who like Otomi.

A right fielder and power hitter with a high strike out rate. He is a talkative friend of Touma and one of many with a crush on Otomi. He usually has the worst academic scores in class.

A first baseman (and catcher) who was the former captain of the Meisei Middle School team and is an old friend of Nikaidou, although their friendship was strained while Nikaidou secretly kept his heart condition from him.

A former member of the Jr. High Baseball team who left after punching Coach Kuroyanagi in the face (for wanting to see Touma pitch). He joined a group of delinquents after that but returned to the team in his second year of High School. He is a stellar defender but not as good of a hitter.

Nikaidou was once the designated ace of Meisei's Middle School baseball team and the son of a rich alumnus who gifts the team equipment and perks. He has some talent but Touma, Souichirou, and the rest of the team resent him for his privileged position despite what they see as a lack of effort, stamina, and being clearly being inferior to Touma. It is revealed that his severe pitch limit and short practice sessions were actually precautions put on him because of a serious heart condition. He was made ace by the coach not due to any bribes but solely as an unsolicited favor to Daisuke's father, a close friend of his. He is forced to leave baseball after a risky life-saving surgery. Believing that he would die from his surgery, he kept it a secret from everyone, thinking those that criticized him would feel extreme guilt once they learned of his death. However, he too comes to appreciate Touma's talent and closely follows the future teams' progress.

A former Meisei Middle School baseball coach. Due largely to Souichirou's game calling, he was able to lead his school's team out of the first tournament block for the first time in 20 years but refused to sit Nikaidou and let Touma pitch in the next block, even though he had obviously lost his ability to pitch effectively. He secretly had a benevolent reason to let him pitch but it led the team to a bad loss after Nikaidou came in late to a tie game and gave up 5 runs to finish it up. Although not forced to, he voluntarily resigned his job for unfairly giving preferential treatment.

Others

The prideful pitcher of the Seinan Junior and High School baseball teams. Like his father before him, he is a very talented pitcher with a particularly good curve ball. He has an obsessive crush on Otomi and goes out of his way to get her attention and ask her out but will also secretly have her picture taken and made into poster sized prints for his room.

Takumi's father Isami is the coach of Seinan High School, the team he played for when he was a pitching rival of Tatsuya and Kazuya Uesugi, thirty years prior. He is still a bit pompous but has become a slightly humbler man. While he is proud that his son resembles him in looks and pitching talent he is a little annoyed with his similar boastfulness and the same sort of hopeless dogged pursuit of an uninterested girl that he displayed when he was his age.

An accomplished left-handed pitcher from Toushuu High. He pitched his team into the quarterfinals of the National Tournament during his second year. In his third year his little sister, Arisa, asked him to bring his team to play a practice game with Meisei in order to humiliate Otomi and her brothers. Although he did win with a complete perfect game, Touma's stunning High School debut somewhat lessened the accomplishment. He pitched the team to the Kōshien that year but only after his team narrowly defeated Meisei in a 15 inning quarter-finals game. He dotes after his younger sister and wants to show off for her, despite her disinterest in baseball.

Ryou Akai's older brother and standout member of the team of scouted players at Kenjou High School. An all-around excellent hitter with tremendous power. His team advances to the Spring Kōshien at the end of his first year.

He is a friendly teacher and used to like baseball.

The owner of the 'Dragon' ramen restaurant and later of the 'Caffè'. He is a great fan of the Meisei baseball team. 
The character comes from Adachi's previous manga Miyuki.

A former Meisei student and friend of Tatsuya Uesugi who returns to the school's area with unexplained amnesia. He was a huge boy who looked much older than his teen age and 30 years later looks almost unchanged, although more scarred. In school he was a boxer and a terror to any delinquent who dared challenge him and upon returning to town he still spooks those that recognize him. After saving Otomi from injury or death in a traffic accident he is invited to stay with the Tachibana family while he tries to regain his memory. He prefers to sleep in a tent in the yard. When he saw Touma and Otomi walking together, they reminded him of Tatsuya and Minami of Touch.

The main character of Touch, Eisuke Tachibana's senior in the third grade and an ace who, twenty-six years before the start of the series, led Meisei High School to the victory for Koshien and caused a whirlwind within Meisei. He still has a lot of fans both inside and outside of Meisei High School. Kazuya Uesugi, his twin brother and an absolute ace of Meisei, died in a car accident in the first year of high school, and he inherited that dream and became Meisei's ace.

Minami is a character from Touch. She serves as the narrator for the Mix anime.

Media

Manga 
Mix is written and illustrated by Mitsuru Adachi. The series began in the June 2012 issue of Shogakukan's Monthly Shōnen Sunday magazine, released on May 12, 2012. In May 2020, it was announced that Mix would go on hiatus due to the COVID-19 pandemic. The series returned from its hiatus on October 12, 2020. Shogakukan has collected its chapters into individual tankōbon volumes. The first volume was released on October 12, 2012. As of February 10, 2023, twenty volumes have been released.

Volume list

Anime 
An anime television series adaptation aired from April 6 to September 28, 2019 on NTV and ytv. Produced by OLM, Yomiuri Telecasting Corporation and Shogakukan-Shueisha Productions, the series is directed by Toshinori Watanabe, with Atsuhiro Tomioka handling series composition, Takao Mai designing the characters and Norihito Sumitomo composing the music. Sumika performs the series' opening theme song "Equal", while Little Glee Monster performs the series' ending theme song "Kimi ni Todoku Made." Porno Graffitti performs the series' second opening theme song, while Qyoto performs the series' second ending theme song. Funimation has licensed the series, and produced an English dub as it aired.

A second season was announced on August 6, 2022. Tomohiro Kamitani is replacing Toshinori Watanabe as director, while the rest of the main staff is returning from the first season. It is set to premiere on April 1, 2023. Sumika will perform the opening theme song "Starting Over", while Miwa will perform the ending theme song "Haru no Oto".

Episode list

Reception 
By November 11, 2012, volume 1 had sold 284,084 copies. By April 6, 2013, volume 2 had sold 345,120 copies. Volume 2 was the 48th best-selling manga volume from November 19, 2012 to May 19, 2013, with 390,176 copies and the 82nd best-selling manga volume from November 19, 2012 to November 17, 2013 with 464,362 copies. By April 6, 2013, volume 3 had sold 319,599 copies. By January 12, 2014, volume 4 had sold 182,060 copies.

References

External links 
 
 
 

2019 anime television series debuts
Anime series based on manga
Baseball in anime and manga
Coming-of-age anime and manga
Funimation
Mitsuru Adachi
OLM, Inc.
Shogakukan manga
Shōnen manga
Upcoming anime television series
Yomiuri Telecasting Corporation original programming